Cadder is a neighbourhood in the north of Glasgow, Scotland.

The amenities are mainly local shops located on Skirsa Street and on Cadder Road. The area also has an eponymous primary school, a nursery on Langa Street and formerly St. Agnes' RC Primary School, which has closed – there are now residential properties of various types situated on the old school site. Overall, housing in the area is a mixture of three-and four-storey tenements and semi detached housing, either privately owned or rented by Cadder Housing Association which has its offices on Fara Street. The Community Centre is located on Tresta Road. Streets are named after features of northern Scotland such as the Shetland Islands.

Cadder has transport links, but they are limited, in contrast to nearby neighbourhoods like Summerston. The area is served by First Glasgow bus services. No. 7/7A (Formerly No. 54), and No. 8/8A. At the time of the line's opening in 1993 the station was named "Lambhill", despite being located on the western side of Cadder some distance from the Lambhill neighbourhood. It was renamed Gilshochill railway station in May 1998.

External links
 Cadder Housing Association

Housing estates in Glasgow
Areas of Glasgow
Maryhill